Nalla Manusukkaran is a 1997 Indian Tamil-language film, directed by Jaya Rajanderan and produced by P. K. Sadevivam and Jaya Rajanderan. The film stars Pandiarajan, Jayarakini, Senthil and S. S. Chandran.

Cast

Pandiarajan
Jayarakini
Senthil
S. S. Chandran
Ennuyir Alex
V. K. Ramasamy
Vennira Aadai Moorthy
Vadivukkarasi
Jyothi Meena
Rocky
Veera
Gandhimathi
Kovai Sarala
Psycho R. S. Nathan
Kumarimuthu
Rocket Ramanathan
P. K. Sadhasivam
S. V. Ramdass
T. K. S. Natarajan
Ali
Charles
Marimuthu
Bindhu Sri
Kanagapriya
Sri Madhi
Shyamala

Soundtrack

Release

References

External links
 

1997 films
Films scored by Deva (composer)
1990s Tamil-language films